Oliver Lobley (born 23 March 2004) is an English professional footballer who plays as a defender for Belper Town.

Career
Lobley joined Scunthorpe United at under-15 level. On 7 May 2022, Lobley made his league debut for Scunthorpe where he scored an own goal in a 7–0 loss against Bristol Rovers and was substituted after 27 minutes. On 10 May 2022, Scunthorpe announced Lobley was one of four second year scholars to be released by the club.

On 27 July 2022, Lobley joined Northern Premier League Premier Division club Belper Town.

References

2004 births
Living people
Footballers from Worksop
Association football defenders
English footballers
English Football League players
Scunthorpe United F.C. players
Belper Town F.C. players